This is a list of Dell Inspiron All-in-One computers.

Ones

List of Dell Inspiron Ones 

 Insprion One 19
 Inspiron One 19 Touch          
 Inspiron One 2020          
 Inspiron One 2205          
 Inspiron One 2305          
 Inspiron One 2310          
 Inspiron One 2320          
 Inspiron One 2330

Comparison of Dell Inspiron Ones

3000 Series 

Inspiron 20 3000 All-in-One Desktop (3043)

Inspiron 20 3000 All-in-One (3052)

Inspiron 20 3000 All-in-One (3059)

Inspiron 20 3000 All-in-One (3064). Features 7th Generation Intel Core i3-7100U processor, 4GB of memory, a 1TB 5400rpm hard drive and Intel HD Graphics 620 with shared graphics memory.

Inspiron 24 3000 All-in-One (3459)

Inspiron 24 3000 All-in-One (AMD) (3455)

5000 Series 

Inspiron 24 5000 All-in-One (5459)

7000 Series 

Inspiron 23 7000 All-in-One Touch Screen Desktop (2350)

Inspiron 24 7000 All-in-One (7459)

References 

Dell products
All-in-one desktop computers